Ulli Steltzer (2 October 1923 - 27 July 2018) was a German photographer best known for her works photographing First Nations people and art in B.C., Canada, including Haida artist Bill Reid. Steltzer had numerous exhibits in and around Vancouver, and both Princeton University and the University of Victoria have collections of her works.

Biography 
Ulli Steltzer was born in 1923 in Frankfurt, Germany.

She immigrated to the United States in 1953, where she opened her first portrait studio on Tulane Street in Princeton, New Jersey. Her photographs of Princeton’s famous locals and visitors quickly gained her recognition across the country.

In the late 1960s, her work evolved to reflect the social issues of the time. She photographed black people under segregation, standing out from the other documentary photographers with her focus on the people, rather than their environment. She later wrote that "[she] was chilled by the discrimination [she] saw practiced against black Americans... Since then [she] devoted a good part of [her] life to documenting the lives and works of men and women of different minorities, both here and abroad."

Steltzer moved to Vancouver in 1972 and started photographing local indigenous people and their artwork. She is quoted saying that she stopped inside a store selling native goods, asked who had created a hand-woven basket and was appalled when the owner couldn't tell her. She credits this experience with her desire to create a book about indigenous artists at work. She used an unobtrusive hand-held Rollei camera to seek out "British Columbia's native artists in their own places, met them informally and recorded their rediscovery of their old skills".

Steltzer was awarded an honorary doctorate by the University of Victoria in 1997.

Steltzer died July 27, 2018 at the age of 94.

Works 
She published numerous photographic collections, including:

References 

Photographers from Frankfurt
1923 births
2018 deaths
German emigrants to the United States
German women photographers